Colin James & The Little Big Band 3 is the tenth studio album by Canadian blues/rock musician Colin James and the third Little Big Band album with its swing/jive themes.  It was released in 2006 (see 2006 in music).

Track listing 
 "Reet Petite"
 "I'm Shakin'"
 "Where Y'At"
 "I Will Be There"
 "Lonely Avenue"
 "I Want You To Be My Baby"
 "That's Where It's At"
 "Please, Baby Don't Do That"
 "No Buts, No Maybes"
 "That's What Love Is Made Of"
 "The Night Is Young (And You're So Fine)"
 "Feelin' Good"
 "If You Need Me"

Personnel 
 Colin James - vocals, electric guitar, guitar solos
 Bob Ruggiero - drums
 Jeff Sarli - upright bass
 Chuck Leavell - piano (tracks 1, 3, 4, 9), organ (track 7)
 Reese Wynans - piano (tracks 2, 6, 7, 8, 10, 11, 12, 13), organ
 Colin Linden - rhythm guitar
 Greg Piccolo - tenor saxophone
 Doug James - baritone saxophone
 Steve Hilliam - tenor saxophone
 Terry Townson - trumpet
 Roy Agee - trombone
 John Whynot - organ (tracks 5, 13)
 Mark C. Jordan - piano (track 5)
 Wayne Jackson - trumpet (track 5)
 Keb' Mo' - harmony vocal (track 7)

External links 
 Colin James & The Little Big Band 3

Colin James albums
2006 albums
MapleMusic Recordings albums